Liles is a surname. Notable people with the surname include: 

 Alva Liles (1956–1998), American football player
 Brent Liles (1963–2007), bassist for Social Distortion from 1981–1984
 Andrew Liles (born 1962), UK sound artist and multi-instrumentalist.
 Buddy Liles, bass singer for the Florida Boys
 Donald H. Liles (born 1947), American professor of industrial engineering
 Frankie Liles (born 1965), American boxer
 John-Michael Liles (born 1980), American ice hockey player
 Kevin Liles (born 1968), American record executive
 Mike Liles (1945-2022), American businessman and politician
 Sonny Liles (1919–2005), American football player
 Suzie Liles (born 1956), American fiber artist

See also 
 Lile (disambiguation)